Zac Dysert (born February 8, 1990) is a former American football quarterback. He played college football for the Miami RedHawks. He was selected by the Denver Broncos in the seventh round of the 2013 NFL Draft, and subsequently played for a number of teams, mostly serving as a practice squad member.

Early years
Zac Dysert is the son of Greg and Carla Dysert. He attended Ada High School in Ada, Ohio. During his high school football career, he threw for 11,174 yards, which ranks second all-time in Ohio prep history, and passed for 100 touchdowns, including 35 as a senior, for the Bulldogs. He twice led Ada High School to the state playoffs, including a 2007 state semifinal appearance.

College career
Dysert played collegiately at Miami University in Oxford, Ohio. He was redshirted as a freshman in 2008. He took over as the starting quarterback in 2009 and completed 247 of 401 passes for 2,611 yards with 12 touchdowns and 16 interceptions. As a sophomore in 2010, he played in 10 games, missing three due to a lacerated spleen. He finished his sophomore season with 2,406 passing yards and 13 touchdowns.

As a junior, he completed 295 of 448 passes for 3,513 yards with 23 touchdowns and 11 interceptions. On November 3, 2012, Dysert became Miami's career passing leader, surpassing former RedHawk and current Pittsburgh Steelers quarterback Ben Roethlisberger in a 27-24 loss to the Buffalo Bulls. He ended his career at Miami with 12,013 passing yards. He earned a bachelor's degree from Miami in December 2012.

College statistics

Professional career

Denver Broncos
Dysert was a quarterback prospect for the 2013 NFL Draft. He was selected by the Denver Broncos in the seventh round (234th overall) and the ninth quarterback drafted (one of the smallest quarterback classes in draft history). He signed a rookie contract for four years and $2,208,000 with a $48,200 signing bonus.

He earned a spot on the Broncos' 53-man roster as a backup to Peyton Manning and Brock Osweiler. For the 2014 season, Dysert remained a member of the Broncos' practice squad. On August 31, 2015, Dysert was cut from the Broncos.

Chicago Bears
On September 1, 2015, he was claimed by the Chicago Bears. He was waived by the Bears on September 6.

Houston Texans
Dysert was signed by the Houston Texans on September 6, 2015 to their practice squad. On November 24, Dysert was released from the team.

Buffalo Bills
Dysert was signed to the practice squad of the Buffalo Bills on December 21, 2015.

Miami Dolphins
Dysert was signed to a reserve/futures contract by the Miami Dolphins on January 19, 2016.  On September 3, Dysert was released by the team.

Arizona Cardinals
On September 4, 2016, Dysert was signed to the Arizona Cardinals' practice squad. On October 3, he was promoted to the Cardinals' active roster. He was released by the team on October 10, and re-signed to the practice squad two days later. He was promoted to the active roster on December 13.

On March 7, 2017, Dysert re-signed with the Cardinals. On June 2, he was waived by the Cardinals.

Dallas Cowboys
On June 5, 2017, Dysert was claimed off waivers by the Dallas Cowboys to replace rookie quarterback Austin Appleby, who was having problems with the center exchanges during practices.
On July 26, it was reported that Dysert would miss the entire upcoming season, due to a herniated disc he suffered while reaching for a bag. He was waived/injured on July 28 and was placed on the injured reserve list on July 31. The injury forced the team to sign quarterback Luke McCown on July 28.

References

External links
Miami RedHawks bio

1990 births
Living people
American football quarterbacks
Miami RedHawks football players
Denver Broncos players
Players of American football from Ohio
People from Ada, Ohio
Chicago Bears players
Houston Texans players
Buffalo Bills players
Miami Dolphins players
Arizona Cardinals players
Dallas Cowboys players